Ivan Yakovlevich Strod (April 10, 1894 – February 4, 1938) was a Soviet Red Army officer during the Russian Civil War in the Russian Far East from 1918 to 1923.

Ivan Strod was born in Ludza into the medical attendant's Latvian family. He participated in World War I and served in the army of the Russian Empire. Ivan Strod volunteered the Red Army in 1918 fighting against the Whites in Siberia. From November 1918 to December 1919 he was in the Olyokminsk prison. After the release, Ivan Strod headed the Volunteer Revolutionary Detachment. In October 1920 he was a commander of a cavalry detachment of the People's Revolutionary Army of the Far Eastern Republic.

He was in charge of defeating a White general Anatoly Pepelyayev during the Yakut Revolt. Ivan Strod was awarded with three Orders of the Red Banner.  In 1927 he was retired because of poor health conditions. Ivan Strod worked for Osoaviakhim works in Tomsk. He was executed during the Great Purge, as a part of the so-called "Latvian Operation".

References
 http://www.hrono.ru/sobyt/1923sssr.html#kalan

1894 births
1938 deaths
People from Ludza
Latvian Operation of the NKVD
Great Purge victims from Latvia
Soviet military personnel of the Russian Civil War
Russian military personnel of World War I